Maxime Puech (born 16 March 1994) is a French professional rugby league footballer who plays as a  for Albi XIII in the Elite One Championship and France at international level.

Background
Puech was born in Tarn, France.

International
He made his international debut in the 62-4 defeat on 25 Oct 2019 against the Junior Kangaroos.

References

External links
Toulouse Olympique profile
France profile

1994 births
Living people
France national rugby league team players
French rugby league players
Racing Club Albi XIII players
Rugby league props
Toulouse Olympique Broncos players
Toulouse Olympique players